Ying Rui was a cruiser built for the Imperial Chinese Navy, which served with the Republic of China Navy. She was built by Vickers Limited in Barrow-in-Furness, England. She was one of three  protected cruisers built, although each one was to different specifications. Initially designated as a training vessel, she saw action at Amoy (now Xiamen) during the Warlord era, before returning again to her training role.

During the Second Sino-Japanese War, Ying Rui was assigned to the Central Fleet. She was bombarded during August and September 1937 by planes of the Imperial Japanese Navy, becoming damaged. By the following month, she was the last vessel of the fleet left afloat. As her armament was being removed for use as shore batteries during the Battle of Nanjing, she was once again attacked by planes from the Japanese aircraft carriers, and was sunk.

Design and development
The Chao Ho class were part of a seven-year modernization program by the Qing dynasty that would have seen the construction of a new modern fleet, including seven battleships and 20 cruisers. The year after being laid down for the Imperial Chinese Navy, the 267-year reign of the Manchu Qing Dynasty came to an end when Dr. Sun Yat-Sen's Xinhai Revolution forced the abdication of the child-emperor Puyi and created the Republic of China. Ying Rui would spend the rest of her service with the Republic of China Navy.

The Chao Ho-class protected cruisers were unusual in that all three semi-sister ships were built in different ship building yards, and although all three ships were built to the same basic design, they varied in size, armour and displacement. Ying Rui displaced , and carried a crew of 270 officers and enlisted men. As a protected cruiser Ying Rui did not have belt armor.

Ying Ruis foremast was stepped further aft and her funnels were spaced wider than her sister ships.  and Ying Rui were the first Chinese vessels to be fitted with a three-shaft Parsons Marine steam turbine. Although primarily powered by coal, compartments for oil were built into both Ying Rui and Chao Ho. Ying Rui was equipped with a variety of armaments, including several different Vickers Limited 50 caliber guns. Other weapons included six QF 3-pounder Hotchkiss guns, two  Maxim guns and two above water mounted torpedo tubes.

Service history
Ying Rui was laid down by Vickers Limited in Barrow-in-Furness, England, in late 1910. She was launched on 13 July 1911 and completed ready for trials on 2 December 1911. The ship headed to the River Clyde, with its crew supplemented by the men of the cruiser , which was also in Barrow-in-Furness at the time. The trials were completed successfully by 9 December. In 1913, after a long loan negotiation, she was delivered to China in April. She was designed and designated as a training cruiser, but on arrival in China, she found herself as one of the most modern vessels of the fledgling Republic of China Navy. In mid-1917, Admiral Sa Zhenbing was offered Ying Rui and Chao Ho to suppress the Manchu Restoration, but declined. In 1920 Ying Rui joined the training squadron of ships based in Nanjing.

In July 1923, during the Warlord era of Chinese history, Ying Rui and fellow cruiser  departed Shanghai with orders to bombard Amoy (now Xiamen) to prevent further navy defections to the Beiyang Government of Northern China. The attack was a success, with the majority of the city re-taken. Ying Rui remained unused in major operations, and along with the rest of the Central Fleet, she declared herself for the Kuomintang on 14 March 1927 during the Northern Expedition. By 1933, Ying Rui had returned to her training role, alongside the unprotected cruiser  and the transport Ching An (formerly the Hamburg America Line transport Sikiang).

At the onset of the Second Sino-Japanese War, Ying Rui had been moved to the Central Fleet alongside the two newest cruisers in the Republic of China Navy,  and the cruiser . The fleet was stationed at Jiangyin at the mouth of the Yangtze River. By the end of September, Ying Rui was the last unsunk cruiser, although it had been damaged from the aerial bombardment. It was decided that she should retire to Nanjing. By mid-October the entire Central Fleet had been sunk by Japanese aircraft leaving Ying Rui the sole ship of the fleet. It was then decided that Ying Ruis naval artillery would be better used as shore batteries during the Battle of Nanking. On 24 October 1937 while her cannons were being removed she was attacked by Japanese dive-bombers and sunk the following day before her artillery could be completely removed.

Notes

References

 
 
 
 

Chao Ho-class cruisers
1911 ships
Ships built in Barrow-in-Furness
Second Sino-Japanese War cruisers of China
Cruisers sunk by aircraft
Ships sunk by Japanese aircraft
Shipwrecks of China
Shipwrecks in rivers
Maritime incidents in 1937
World War II naval ships of China